Letharchus is a genus of eels in the snake eel family Ophichthidae. It currently contains the following species:

 Letharchus aliculatus McCosker, 1974
 Letharchus rosenblatti McCosker, 1974 (Sailfin snake-eel)
 Letharchus velifer Goode & T. H. Bean, 1882 (American sailfin eel)

References

 

Ophichthidae